In computer programming, a sentinel node is a specifically designated node used with linked lists and trees as a traversal path terminator. This type of node does not hold or reference any data managed by the data structure.

Benefits

Sentinels are used as an alternative over using NULL as the path terminator in order to get one or more of the following benefits:
 Marginally increased speed of operations
 Increased data structure robustness (arguably)

Drawbacks
 Marginally increased algorithmic complexity and code size.
 If the data structure is accessed concurrently (which means that all nodes being accessed have to be protected at least for “read-only”), for a sentinel-based implementation the sentinel node has to be protected for “read-write” by a mutex. This extra mutex in quite a few use scenarios can cause severe performance degradation. One way to avoid it is to protect the list structure as a whole for “read-write”, whereas in the version with NULL it suffices to protect the data structure as a whole for “read-only” (if an update operation will not follow).
 The sentinel concept is not useful for the recording of the data structure on disk.

Examples

Search in a linked list 
Below are two versions of a subroutine (implemented in the C programming language) for looking up a given search key in a singly linked list. The first one uses the sentinel value NULL, and the second one a (pointer to the) sentinel node Sentinel, as the end-of-list indicator. The declarations of the singly linked list data structure and the outcomes of both subroutines are the same.

struct sll_node {                          // one node of the singly linked list
    struct sll_node *next;                 // end-of-list indicator or -> next node
    int key;
} sll, *first;

First version using NULL as an end-of-list indicator 
// global initialization
first = NULL;                              // before the first insertion (not shown)

struct sll_node *Search(struct sll_node *first, int search_key) {
    struct sll_node *node;
    for (node = first; 
        node != NULL; 
        node = node->next)
    {
        if (node->key == search_key)
            return node;                   // found
    }
    // search_key is not contained in the list:
    return NULL;
}
The for-loop contains two tests (yellow lines) per iteration:
 node != NULL;
 if (node->key == search_key).

Second version using a sentinel node 
The globally available pointer sentinel to the deliberately prepared data structure Sentinel is used as end-of-list indicator. 
// global variable
sll_node Sentinel, *sentinel = &Sentinel;
// global initialization
sentinel->next = sentinel;
first = sentinel;                          // before the first insertion (not shown)
Note that the pointer sentinel has always to be kept at the end of the list.
This has to be maintained by the insert and delete functions. It is, however, about the same effort as when using a NULL pointer.

struct sll_node *SearchWithSentinelnode(struct sll_node *first, int search_key) {
    struct sll_node *node;
    // Prepare the “node” Sentinel for the search:
    sentinel->key = search_key;
    for (node = first; 
        node->key != search_key; 
        node = node->next)
    {}
 
    // Post-processing:
    if (node != sentinel)
        return node;                       // found
    // search_key is not contained in the list:
    return NULL;
}
The for-loop contains only one test (yellow line) per iteration:
 node->key != search_key;.

Python implementation of a circular doubly-linked list 
Linked list implementations, especially one of a circular, doubly-linked list, can be simplified remarkably using a sentinel node to demarcate the beginning and end of the list.

 The list starts out with a single node, the sentinel node which has the next and previous pointers point to itself. This condition determines if the list is empty.
 In a non-empty list, the sentinel node's next pointer gives the head of the list, and the previous pointer gives the tail of the list.

Following is a Python implementation of a circular doubly-linked list:

class Node:
    def __init__(self, data, next=None, prev=None):
        self.data = data
        self.next = next
        self.prev = prev

    def __repr__(self) -> str:
        return f'Node(data={self.data})'

class LinkedList:
    def __init__(self):
        self._sentinel = Node(data=None)
        self._sentinel.next = self._sentinel
        self._sentinel.prev = self._sentinel

    def pop_left(self) -> Node:
        return self.remove_by_ref(self._sentinel.next)

    def pop(self) -> Node:
        return self.remove_by_ref(self._sentinel.prev)

    def append_nodeleft(self, node):
        self.add_node(self._sentinel, node)

    def append_node(self, node):
        self.add_node(self._sentinel.prev, node)

    def append_left(self, data):
        node = Node(data=data)
        self.append_nodeleft(node)

    def append(self, data):
        node = Node(data=data)
        self.append_node(node)

    def remove_by_ref(self, node) -> Node:
        if node is self._sentinel:
            raise Exception('Can never remove sentinel.')
        node.prev.next = node.next
        node.next.prev = node.prev
        node.prev = None
        node.next = None
        return node

    def add_node(self, curnode, newnode):
        newnode.next = curnode.next
        newnode.prev = curnode
        curnode.next.prev = newnode
        curnode.next = newnode

    def search(self, value):
        self._sentinel.data = value
        node = self._sentinel.next
        while node.data != value:
            node = node.next
        self._sentinel.data = None
        if node is self._sentinel:
            return None
        return node

    def __iter__(self):
        node = self._sentinel.next
        while node is not self._sentinel:
            yield node.data
            node = node.next

    def reviter(self):
        node = self._sentinel.prev
        while node is not self._sentinel:
            yield node.data
            node = node.prev

Notice how the add_node() method takes the node that will be displaced by the new node in the parameter curnode. For appending to the left, this is the head of a non-empty list, while for appending to right, it is the tail. But because of how the linkage is set up to refer back to the sentinel, the code just works for empty lists as well, where curnode will be the sentinel node.

Search in a binary tree 
General declarations, similar to article Binary search tree:
struct bst_node {                     // one node of the binary search tree
    struct bst_node *child[2];        // each: ->node  or  end-of-path indicator
    int key;
} ;

struct bst {                          // binary search tree
    struct bst_node *root;            // ->node  or  end-of-path indicator
} *BST;

The globally available pointer sentinel to the single deliberately prepared data structure Sentinel = *sentinel is used to indicate the absence of a child.
// global variable
bst_node Sentinel, *sentinel = &Sentinel;
// global initialization
Sentinel.child[0] = Sentinel.child[1] = sentinel;

BST->root = sentinel;                 // before the first insertion (not shown)
Note that the pointer sentinel has always to represent every leaf of the tree.
This has to be maintained by the insert and delete functions. It is, however, about the same effort as when using a NULL pointer.

struct bst_node *SearchWithSentinelnode(struct bst *bst, int search_key) {
    struct bst_node *node;
    // Prepare the “node” Sentinel for the search:
    sentinel->key = search_key;
 
    for (node = bst->root;;) {
        if (search_key == node->key)
            break;
        if search_key < node->key:
            node = node->child[0];    // go left
        else
            node = node->child[1];    // go right
    }
 
    // Post-processing:
    if (node != sentinel)
        return node;                  // found
    // search_key is not contained in the tree:
    return NULL;
}

Remarks
 With the use of SearchWithSentinelnode searching loses the R/O property. This means that in applications with concurrency it has to be protected by a mutex, an effort which normally exceeds the savings of the sentinel.
 SearchWithSentinelnode does not support the tolerance of duplicates.
 There has to be exactly one “node” to be used as sentinel, but there may be extremely many pointers to it.

See also 
 Canary value
 Elephant in Cairo
 Guard (computer science), a boolean expression that must evaluate to true if the program execution is to continue in the branch in question
 Magic number (programming)
 Magic string
 Null object pattern
 Semipredicate problem
 Sentinel value
 Time formatting and storage bugs

References

Linked lists
Trees (data structures)